Bryce Lawrence (born 23 December 1970) is a former professional international rugby union referee from the Bay of Plenty, New Zealand. He is now the National Referee Manager for the New Zealand Rugby Union.

Overview
Originally a primary school headmaster, Lawrence took up refereeing in 1994, following in footsteps of his father, Keith Lawrence, who had been an international rugby union referee from 1985 to 1991. Making his first class debut in 1997, Bryce took charge of his first Super Rugby match in 2005, controlling a game between the Crusaders and Chiefs. His more notable matches in charge include the 2008 Super 14 semi-final between the Waratahs and the Sharks, the final of the 2008 Air New Zealand Cup and two test matches involving Australia and South Africa in the 2008 Tri Nations. Lawrence refereed his first Tri Nations matches during the 2008 series.

Lawrence refereed the first British & Irish Lions test during their 2009 tour of South Africa and was an assistant referee in the second test. He refereed the Six Nations France versus England match in 2010.

Bryce Lawrence refereed the quarterfinal in the 2011 rugby world cup between South Africa and Australia. He performed poorly, making mistakes which affected the outcome of the match. He allegedly received threats from South African supporters and refused to referee there during the 2012 Super Rugby season. Lawrence was dropped from the nine-man elite panel in 2012.

During the 2012 ITM Cup Lawrence refereed his 200th first class match. The milestone was played between Wellington and Taranaki Rugby Football Union. He is only the fourth New Zealand referee to reach the double century milestone with former New Zealand referees Paddy O'Brien (221 matches), Paul Honiss (220) and now Australian referee Steve Walsh (210) doing so before him. The 200th match was supposedly Lawrence's last match but due to other referees retaining injuries Lawrence refereed the semi-final of the 2012 ITM Cup.

He announced his retirement in 2012, motivated partly by reactions to his self-acknowledged poor performance in the 2011 Rugby World Cup quarter-final match between South Africa and Australia.

References

1970 births
Living people
New Zealand rugby union referees
People from the Bay of Plenty Region
Super Rugby referees
Rugby World Cup referees
The Rugby Championship referees
Six Nations Championship referees